The ISU Grand Prix of Figure Skating (known as ISU Champions Series from 1995 to 1997) is a series of senior international figure skating competitions organized by the International Skating Union. The invitational series was inaugurated in 1995, incorporating several previously existing events. Medals are awarded in the disciplines of men's singles, ladies' singles, pair skating, and ice dancing. The junior-level equivalent is the ISU Junior Grand Prix.

Seasons

Summary

Competitions
Currently, the sanctioned competitions for the Grand Prix are:
  Skate America. First held in 1979 as Norton Skate, the event has been part of the series since 1995 and its location changes yearly. 
  Skate Canada International. First held in 1973, the event has been part of the series since 1995 and its location changes yearly. It was cancelled in 2020 due to the COVID-19 pandemic.
  Grand Prix de France (Grand Prix International de Paris 1987–93, Trophée de France 1994–95, 2016, Trophée Lalique 1996–2003, Trophée Éric Bompard 2004–15, and Internationaux de France 2017–21). First held in 1987, the event has been part of the series since 1995. From 1987 to 2014, it was always held in Paris, with the exception of 1991 (Albertville), 1994 (Lyon), and 1995 (Bordeaux). Since 2014, it has been held in Bordeaux (2014–15), Paris (2016), Grenoble (2017–19, 2021), and Angers (2022–23). It was cancelled after the first day in 2015 due to the November 2015 Paris attacks (the short program/dance results were considered as the final results) and in 2020 due to the COVID-19 pandemic.
  MK John Wilson Trophy. The event replaced Cup of China in 2022 due to strict COVID-19 protocols implemented by the host nation
  NHK Trophy. First held in 1979, the event has been part of the series since 1995. The location changes yearly — it has been held in Tokyo, Sapporo, Kobe, Kushiro, Asahikawa, Hiroshima, Chiba, Morioka, Nagoya, Osaka, Nagano, Kumamoto, Kyoto, Fukuoka, and Sendai.
  Grand Prix Espoo. The event replaced Rostelecom Cup in 2022 after it was cancelled due to the ISU ban against Russia over the 2022 Russian invasion of Ukraine.
 Grand Prix of Figure Skating Final (Champions Series Final from 1995 to 1997). Created in 1995 to serve as the concluding event, it features the top six qualifiers in each discipline from the six earlier competitions. The event adopted its current name in the 1998–99 season. Its location changes yearly. It was cancelled in 2020 and 2021 due to the COVID-19 pandemic.

Suspended competitions
  Cup of China. It was created in 2003 and joined the Grand Prix series in the same year, replacing the German event. It has been held in Beijing, Shanghai, Harbin, Nanjing, and Chongqing. It was replaced in 2018 by the Grand Prix of Helsinki and in 2021 by the Gran Premio d'Italia. The event was again cancelled in 2022 due to concerns surrounding the COVID-19 pandemic.

Banned competitions
  Rostelecom Cup (Cup of Russia from 1996–2008, 2010). The Prize of Moscow News (1966–1990) having disappeared with the breakup of the Soviet Union, the Cup of Russia was established in 1996 and joined the series in the same year, adopting the name Rostelecom Cup from 2009 onwards (with the exception of 2010). It is generally held in Moscow, but has also been held in Saint Petersburg and Sochi. The event was cancelled in 2022 after the ISU banned participation by the Figure Skating Federation of Russia in international competitions following the 2022 Russian invasion of Ukraine.

Discontinued competitions
  Bofrost Cup on Ice (Earlier names: Fujifilm Trophy from 1986 to 1987, Nations Cup from 1995 to 1997, Sparkassen Cup on Ice from 1998 to 2001). First held in 1986, the event was part of the series from 1995 to 2002. Generally held in Gelsenkirchen, the event adopted the name Bofrost Cup on Ice in 2002.
  Grand Prix of Helsinki. The event replaced Cup of China in 2018. Cup of China returned to the series during the 2019–20 season.
  Gran Premio d'Italia. The event replaced Cup of China in 2021 after it was cancelled due to the COVID-19 pandemic.

Background
Fall international competitions such as Skate America, organized by the skating federations of their host countries, had been held for many years prior to being organized into a series as separate individual events.  Following the Nancy Kerrigan attack in 1994, television coverage of skating was saturated with made-for-TV professional skating events, while the traditional "amateur" or "eligible" competitions were neglected. In order to remedy this situation, in 1995, the skating federations from the United States, Canada, Germany, France, and Japan began to plan their events as a series with cooperative marketing of the television rights in those countries, and with prize money funded by the sale of those rights. At this point, the International Skating Union stepped in and asserted its ownership of the international television rights to the series.

When it was first created in the 1995–1996 skating season, the series was known as the ISU Champions Series. It did not become known as the Grand Prix of Figure Skating until the 1998–1999 season, when the ISU gained the rights to use that name.

It was originally composed of five events, held in the United States, Canada, Japan, Germany, and France. Following the demise of the Prize of Moscow News, last held in 1990, the Russian federation created the Cup of Russia, which increased the number of events to six in 1996, the series' second year. In the fall of 2003, the event in Germany, the Bofrost Cup on Ice, was discontinued, and was replaced with one in China, due to the ISU having negotiated a more favorable television contract in that country.

In 1997, the ISU also created a similar series of developmental events for junior age-eligible skaters. Initially known as the ISU Junior Series, these events are now named the ISU Junior Grand Prix. This season begins before the senior-level one does.

Qualifying
Skaters are entered in the individual events either by being seeded or by invitation. The seeding of top skaters at Grand Prix events basically takes into account their placement from the previous World Championships, as well as their ISU international ranking. Skaters who are not seeded can be invited by the hosting country and each country can invite up to three of their own skaters for each discipline. This is to give a balanced field throughout the series, as well as allowing the hosting country a chance to showcase their top competitors.

The Grand Prix of Figure Skating uses a points-based system based on results from the selected international events. The top qualifying skaters from each discipline are eligible to compete in the Grand Prix Figure Skating Final.  The entry, seeding, and qualification rules for the individual events have varied from year to year, and also between the different disciplines.  Currently, skaters  are assigned to one or two events.

Starting with the 2003–04 season, the Interim Judging System was introduced for scoring events in the Grand Prix. This later developed into the ISU Judging System, often called the Code of Points (CoP), of figure skating, replacing the previous 6.0 system.

Over the years, the ISU has experimented with different formats for the Grand Prix Final competition. In some years, skaters were required to prepare three different programs rather than the normal two, with the third program being used for a skate-off between the top two finishers in each discipline after the initial rounds. This is no longer the case.

Eligibility 
To be eligible for the senior Grand Prix series, skaters are required to have turned 15 by the preceding July 1 (e.g. July 1, 2009 for the 2009–10 series). A skater must meet the age requirement before it turns July 1 in their place of birth. For example, Adelina Sotnikova was born a few hours into July 1, 1996, in Moscow and consequently, was not eligible to compete until the 2011–12 season.

In 2011, minimum score requirements were added to the senior Grand Prix series and set at two-thirds of the top scores at the 2011 World Championships. Prior to competing in a senior Grand Prix event, skaters must earn the following:

The International Skating Union decided that the minimums do not apply to "host picks", i.e. Canadians Adriana DeSanctis and Elladj Baldé were allowed to compete at their home country's event, 2011 Skate Canada, despite failing to reach the minimums at the 2011 Nebelhorn Trophy.

Gold medalists

Men

Women

Pairs

Ice dance

† From 1995 to 2002, this spot on the Grand Prix calendar was filled by the German Cup on Ice (which went by several different names in succession). The Cup of China replaced it on the circuit in 2003 and has held that spot ever since, with the exception of 2018, 2021 and 2022, when the Cup of China did not take place; its spots on the calendar were filled that years by the 2018 Grand Prix of Helsinki, 2021 Gran Premio d'Italia and 2022 MK John Wilson Trophy respectively. The names of the medalists in this table reflect the winners of those respective events for the years that the Cup of China was not held.

‡ Previously known as the Trophée de France (1995, 2016), Trophée Lalique (1996–2003), Trophée Éric Bompard (2004–2015), and Internationaux de France (2017–2021).

‡‡ Known since 2009 as the Rostelecom Cup for commercial purposes. It was held until 2022 when the ISU banned participation by the Figure Skating Federation of Russia in international competitions following the 2022 Russian invasion of Ukraine. Its spot on the calendar was filled by the Grand Prix of Espoo. The names of the medalists in this table reflect the winners of this event for the years that the Cup of Russia was not held.

‡‡‡ Event cancelled due to the COVID-19 pandemic.

Top gold medalists
Only top 10 positions by number of victories (in each discipline) are shown here. Bold denotes active skater. Skaters who at least once participated in three Grand Prix events within a single season, the Grand Prix Final not included, are marked with an asterisk (*).

Medal tables (1995–2022)

Men

Pairs

Women

Ice dance

Cumulative medal count

References

External links
ISU Grand Prix Main Page
Medals table and winner information, 1995–2002
1998–1999 Grand Prix
1999–2000 Grand Prix
2000–2001 Grand Prix
2001–2002 Grand Prix
2002–2003 Grand Prix

 
Grand Prix